Jenna Arnold (born Jennifer S Arnold on July 1, 1981) is an American activist, entrepreneur and author of Raising Our Hands (2020). She is known as the co-founder of ORGANIZE, for her work at the United Nations and MTV, and was a National Organizer for the 2017 Women's March on Washington. Oprah has called Arnold one of the "100 Awakened Leaders who are using their voice and talent to elevate humanity". She is a frequent contributor on the subjects of American identity, politics and foreign policy on FOX, CNN, and MSNBC.

Early life 

Arnold was born and raised in Elkins Park, outside Philadelphia, PA, where she attended Abington Friends School.  She received a B.S. Ed. with a Minor in Astrophysics from University of Miami in 2003 and an M.A. in International Education Development from Columbia University Teachers College in 2005.”

Career 

Arnold began her career as an elementary school teacher in Miami-Dade Public Schools and Los Angeles Unified School District.

While an Education and Media Specialist at the United Nations, Arnold created multi-platform programming with A-list celebrities like Jay-Z and Angelina Jolie.

Arnold founded PressPlay, a strategic advising agency focusing on global issues. Arnold's most high profile show, “Exiled!”, was predicated on uprooting sheltered, affluent American teenagers to live with indigenous communities throughout Kenya, Thailand, Panama, Namibia, Brazil, India, Vanuatu, Norway, and Peru. “Exiled!” aired in over one hundred countries. Exiled! was sold to MTV, where Arnold became one of Viacom's youngest Executive Producers.

Arnold is the co-founder of ORGANIZE, a non-profit organization focused on reforming the US organ donation system and increasing patient access to lifesaving transplants. Their work will lead to 7,300 more organ transplants a year, save Medicare at least $1 billion in dialysis costs annually, and increase transplant equity. ORGANIZE produced advocacy campaigns, which the New York Times called one of the year's "Biggest Ideas in Social Change", built the first centralized organ donor registry, and was an Innovator in Residence in the Office of the Secretary in the U.S. Department of Health and Human Services, which led to groundbreaking research. This led to an Executive Order signed by the Trump Administration that proposed a new HHS rule that received bi-partisan support from the Senate Finance Committee, the House Committee on Oversight and Reform, Senator Warren (D-MA), Blumenthal (D-CT), Grassley (R-IA), and Young (R-IN). Arnold was a featured presenter at the White House Organ Donation Summit, which also included major partnership announcements with Facebook, Twitter, Instagram, and NASA, and a $300 million bioengineering investment from the United States Department of Defense.

Arnold was a National Organizer for the 2017 Women's March on Washington. She was a contributor to the best-selling book about organizing the march, Together We Rise: Behind the Scenes at the Protest Heard Around the World.

Arnold was the Chief Impact Officer for Rethink Capital Partners, an impact investing platform working to solve some of the world’s most complex problems: equitable education, food distribution, climate sustainability, community growth, and empowering women and minority populations.

Jenna’s first book (BenBella), Raising Our Hands: How White Women Can Stop Avoiding Hard Conversations, Start Accepting Responsibility, and Find Our Place on the New Frontlines (2020) debuted on a series of bestseller lists, as well as Forbes’ ‘Anti-racism for White People Resource List’. Porchlight calls it “one of the white privileged voices we should be reading right now”.

Arnold was a surrogate for the Biden 2020 campaign, continues to serve as a political and social voice on Fox News Channel, MSNBC, as well as international outlets. She continues to write, speak and be a source on American identity, allyship, conflict resolution, and civic engagement.

Jenna sits on the Sesame Workshop Leadership Council, is a member of the Council on Foreign Relations and is an emeritus World Economic Forum’s Global Shaper.

Awards and recognition 

Independent Publisher awarded “Raising Our Hands” the 2021 gold medal in the Women’s Issues category and the book was a finalist in the Indie Book Awards.

Arnold was honored at the Emily's List Gala along with two other National Organizers of the Women's March. In November 2017, Arnold won Glamour Women of the Year for her contributions to the Women’s March.

Arnold was named one of Inc. Magazine's "35 Under 35" as well as one of Inc. Magazine's "20 Most Disruptive Innovators", and received a TriBeCa Disruptive Innovator Fellowship.

Arnold's work has also been featured in the New York Times, Washington Post, Wall Street Journal, Associated Press, Forbes, Slate, Fast Company, CNN, Politico, Axios, US News, USA Today, and Full Frontal with Samantha Bee Full Frontal. ORGANIZE's work to modernize the living donation technology infrastructure was also featured on the May 14th, 2017 episode of HBO's Last Week Tonight with John Oliver. Notably, an ESPN article recounts a story of Arnold negotiating with the Boston Red Sox during the 15th hour of labor during her first pregnancy.

Personal 

Arnold married social entrepreneur Jeremy Goldberg, President of LeagueApps, at the Seeds of Peace Camp in Maine in 2008. She is the daughter of healthcare executive Lauren Arnold and artist/architect Michael Arnold, who currently resides in Dubai with Jenna’s brother Tom Arnold. Her daughter, Ever Alula, was born in 2015, and son, Atlas Oz, 2017.

Her paternal grandfather, William Cahan, founded the anti-tobacco movement and her step-grandmother, Grace Mirabella, was the Editor-in-Chief of Vogue from 1971-1988 and founder of Mirabella magazine.

References

1981 births
Living people
21st-century American women